Gribanovo is a rural locality (a village) in Lobanovskoye Rural Settlement, Permsky District, Perm Krai, Russia. The population was 10 as of 2010. There is 1 street.

Geography 
Gribanovo is located 30 km south of Perm (the district's administrative centre) by road. Maly Burtym is the nearest rural locality.

References 

Rural localities in Permsky District